Kiko de la Rica (born 6 April 1965) is a Spanish cinematographer. He contributed to more than forty films including Sex and Lucia and The Last Circus.

Career
De la Rica won the Best Cinematography award for Torremolinos 73 at the Cinespaña Festival in Toulouse. He received nominations for the Goya Award for Best Cinematography for Common Wealth, Sex and Lucia, The Last Circus, and Witching & Bitching, and won the award for Blancanieves in 2013. He also received the Golden Camera 300 award at the Manaki Brothers Film Festival in 2013 for Blancanieves.

Filmography
 El reino de Víctor (1989) Short
 Mirindas asesinas (1991) Short
 Ana y los Davis (1994) Short
 Malditas sean las suegras(1994) Short
 Salto al vacío (1995)
 Adiós Toby, adiós (1995) Short
 Pasajes  (1996)
 Marisma (1997) Short
 Sólo se muere dos veces (1997)
 Muerto de amor (1997) Short
 Entre todas las mujeres  (1998)
 Pecata minuta (1998)
 Ordinary Americans: Americanos cotidianos (1999) Short
 Carretera y manta (2000)
 Common Wealth (2000)
 Sabotage! (2000)
 Sex and Lucia (2001)
 Killer Housewives (2001)
 Torremolinos 73 (2003)
 Chill Out! (2003)
 Football Days (2003)
 Lo mejor que le puede pasar a un cruasán (2003)
 Torapia (2004)
 El Calentito (2005)
 Días de cine (2007)
 Guantanamero (2007)
 Mataharis (2007)
 The Oxford Murders (2008)
 14, Fabian Road (2008)
 Return to Hansala (2008)
 Born to Suffer (2009)
 Parenthesis (Short) (2009)
 The Last Circus (2010)
 As Luck Would Have It (2011)
 Blancanieves (2012)
 Witching & Bitching (2013)
 La vida inesperada (2013)
 Luz con Maestros (2013)
 Words with Gods (2014) (segment "The Confession")
 Messi (2014)
 Francis: Pray for Me (2015)
 Ma ma (2015)
 Kiki, Love to Love (2016)
 Un beso de película (2017) Short
 Abracadabra (2017)
 El pelotari y la fallera (2017) Short
 Sin rodeos (2018)
 El árbol de la sangre (2018)

References

External links

1965 births
Living people
Spanish cinematographers